Rasmus Persson (born 25 May 1996) is a Swedish footballer who plays for FK Karlskrona as a defender.

References

External links

1996 births
Living people
Association football defenders
Mjällby AIF players
Swedish footballers
Allsvenskan players